The Old Dogs was a country supergroup.

Old Dogs may refer to:

 Old Dogs (album), the debut album by the Old Dogs.
 Old Dogs (film), a 2009 American comedy film starring John Travolta and Robin Williams
 Old Dog (film), a 2011 film by Tibetan director Pema Tseden.

See also
 Old Blind Dogs
 Old Dogs, New Dicks
 Flight of the Old Dog
 List of oldest dogs